Pistha is a 2022 Indian Tamil-language drama film directed by M. Ramesh Baarathi and starring Shirish and Mrudula Murali. It was released on 7 October 2022.

Cast
Shirish as Sandhai Saravanan
Mrudula Murali as Selvi
Arundhati Nair as Nandhinee
Sathish as Sathish
Senthil 
Namo Narayanan as Mahal Owner(main antagonist)
Yogi Babu as Mark Babu
Chandini as Bride alliance
G. Gnanasambandam as Kamal Haasan(Saravanan's father)
Swaminathan as Gemini Ganesan(Saravanan"s grandfather)
Mahanadi Shankar as catering owner 
Bava Lakshmanan as Saravanan's relative
Supergood Subramaniam

Music
"Azhagula Rasathi" - Yuvan Shankar Raja
"Vaa Vaa" - Ranina Reddy, Ramesh

Production
Ramesh Bharathi, the editor of Metro (2016), announced that he would work with actor Shirish on a comedy entertainer titled Pistha in July 2017. The shoot began during August 2017, with a number of notable supporting actors including Sathish, Yogi Babu and Senthil joining the cast. Production progressed slowly, with a five-year delay between the film's start and release.

Prior to the film's release, it was marketed as the 25th film of music composer Dharan Kumar.

Reception
The film was released on 7 October 2022 across Tamil Nadu. A critic from Maalai Malar gave the film a mixed review, noting that "the effort should have been better". A reviewer from Times of India gave the film a negative review, writing it was "a below average mindless rural entertainer". The film also received mixed reviews from critics at The Hindu, Dinamalar and Dina Thanthi.

References

External links

2022 films
2020s Tamil-language films
Films scored by Dharan Kumar